Robson/Raspberry is a designated place located north of Castlegar across the Columbia River combining two historical communities, Robson, formerly a steamboat landing and railway terminal, and Raspberry, formerly encompassing Sproat's Landing and later a Doukhobor colony. It has one school, Robson Community School.

Demographics
 Population(2006): 464
 Population(2001): 502
 Total Dwellings: 207
 Area: 5.52 km²
 Population Density: 84/km²

Populated places in the West Kootenay
British Columbia populated places on the Columbia River
Designated places in British Columbia